Sitting Pretty is a 1948 American comedy film which tells the story of a family who hires Lynn Belvedere, a man with a mysterious past, to babysit their children. It stars Robert Young, Maureen O'Hara, and Clifton Webb. The film was adapted by F. Hugh Herbert from Gwen Davenport's 1947 comic novel Belvedere. It was directed by Walter Lang.

The character of Belvedere proved so popular and Webb reprised his role in two more sequels: Mr. Belvedere Goes to College (1949) and Mr. Belvedere Rings the Bell (1951).

Plot 
Lawyer Harry King and his wife Tacey have trouble retaining a nanny for their three young, rambunctious boys. When the latest in a string of servants (all women) quits, Tacey advertises for a replacement and hires Lynn Belvedere sight unseen, only to discover upon his arrival that Lynn is a dapper gentleman, one with many skills and achievements. Despite their misgivings (and Belvedere's declaration that he detests children), the Kings reluctantly agree to a trial period. Belvedere quickly wins over the boys, but his superior attitude annoys Harry.

Before Harry goes on a business trip, Tacey agrees to take their youngest child (still a baby) and sleep over each night at the home of their friends, fellow lawyer Bill Philby and his wife Edna, just to squelch any possibility of scandal in their suburban community of Hummingbird Hill over her remaining in the house with Belvedere. Late that night, however, one of the boys becomes sick. Belvedere calls Tacey and she rushes over. It turns out to be just a stomach ache, but nosy neighbor Clarence Appleton notices the lights on and comes over to investigate. He starts spreading scandalous rumors linking Belvedere and Tacey romantically. The gossip eventually reaches Horatio J. Hammond, Harry's boss. When Harry returns triumphant from his trip, Hammond complains that Tacey is endangering the law firm's reputation. Though Harry does not believe the stories, he still thinks it would be best if Belvedere found other employment, but he is persuaded by his wife and children to change his mind.

Later, Tacey and Edna attend a night lecture. Afterward, they go for a snack in a fancy restaurant, where they encounter Belvedere on his day off. Belvedere invites Tacey to dance. They are spotted dancing cheek to cheek by Appleton and his equally inquisitive mother, and the malicious rumors start again. This time, Harry is not so understanding. Insulted, Tacey quarrels with him, takes their youngest, and flies to her parents' home in Fort Worth, Texas.

In the meantime, we learn that Belvedere has spent the past few weeks secretly researching and writing a salacious account of the goings-on among the residents of Hummingbird Hill. In fact, the book's blurb describes it as "a screaming satire on suburban manners and morals". The published tome becomes a national bestseller, upsetting everyone in the community. Tacey rushes home and is reconciled with her husband. Hammond fires Harry and Bill, and then announces his decision to sue Belvedere, who is pleased, as he expects the publicity to increase sales of his already popular book. He hires Harry and Bill to defend him, then reveals the source of much of his information: none other than Clarence Appleton. The informant flees, with Hammond and others in hot pursuit. Despite his new fame, Belvedere agrees to keep his job as his successful book is only the first volume of what will become a trilogy.

Cast

Production 
The film was originally titled Belvedere, but then changed to Sitting Pretty. John Payne was meant to play the role of the husband.

Photographer Loomis Dean visited the set to photograph the filming for Life and photographed Webb together with then yet unknown actresses Laurette Luez and Marilyn Monroe, who do not appear in the film.

This is one of few films Webb made where he dances. Before 1944, he was an accomplished Broadway star, known for his dancing, singing, and comedic talents.

Reception
Bosley Crowther wrote in The New York Times that while "light in substance, but solid in humor, this [movie's] material is handled dexterously by all who come anywhere near it – and especially, as we say, by Mr. Webb". He also found Maureen O'Hara and Robert Young "delightfully clever".

Awards
 Clifton Webb was nominated for the Academy Award for Best Actor at the 1948 Academy Awards.
 F. Hugh Herbert won the Writers Guild of America, Best Written American Comedy in 1949.
 The film won a gold medal at the Photoplay Awards 1948.

Adaptions
A radio adaptation was presented by Lux Radio Theater on February 14, 1949. The film also inspired the television series Mr. Belvedere, starring Christopher Hewett, which first aired in 1985.

References

External links 
 
 
 
 
 
 

1948 films
1948 comedy films
20th Century Fox films
American comedy films
American black-and-white films
Films scored by Alfred Newman
Films based on American novels
Films directed by Walter Lang
Fiction about child care occupations
Photoplay Awards film of the year winners
1940s English-language films
1940s American films